KUFA (104.3 FM) is a radio station licensed to serve the community of Hebbronville, Texas. The station is owned by Rufus Resources, LLC, and airs a classic country format as part of a group of stations branded as the "No Bull Radio Network".

The station was assigned the KUFA call letters by the Federal Communications Commission on April 7, 2016.

References

External links
 Official Website
 FCC Public Information File for KUFA
 

UFA (FM)
Radio stations established in 2018
2018 establishments in Texas
Classic country radio stations in the United States
Jim Hogg County, Texas